Gian Paolo Iraldo (2 June 1943 - 17 August 2009) was an Italian sprinter, mainly specialized in 400 metres.

Biography
He won one medals at the International athletics competitions with the national relay team. He has 10 caps in national team from 1962 to 1963. He died at the age of 66 in a car accident in his native Cuneo.

See also
 Italy national relay team

References

External links
 

1943 births
2009 deaths
Italian male sprinters
Road incident deaths in Italy
Universiade medalists in athletics (track and field)
Universiade gold medalists for Italy
Medalists at the 1965 Summer Universiade
20th-century Italian people